Rose Van Crombrugge was a Belgian sprinter. She competed in the women's 4 × 100 metres relay at the 1928 Summer Olympics.

References

External links
 

Year of birth missing
Year of death missing
Athletes (track and field) at the 1928 Summer Olympics
Belgian female sprinters
Olympic athletes of Belgium
Place of birth missing
Olympic female sprinters